The EMD MP15AC is a  diesel switcher locomotive built by General Motors' Electro-Motive Division between August 1975 and August 1984. A variant of the EMD MP15DC with an AC-DC transmission, 246 examples were built, including 25 for export to Mexico, and four built in Canada.

Development 
Soon there was a demand for a model with an advanced AC drive system. The MP15AC replaced the MP15DC’s DC generator with an alternator producing AC power which is converted to DC for the traction motors with a silicon rectifier. The MP15AC is  longer than an MP15DC, the extra space being needed for the rectifier equipment. The alternator-rectifier combination is more reliable than a generator, and this equipment became the standard for new diesel-electric locomotive designs.

The MP15AC is easily distinguished from the DC models. Instead of the front-mounted radiator intake and belt-driven fan used on all previous EMD switchers, these have intakes on the lower forward nose sides and electric fans. Side intakes allowed the unit to take in cooler air, and the electric fans improved a serious reliability issue found in its earlier DC sisters.

Engine 
The MP15 used a roots-blown 12-cylinder 645E engine. The 645 series, introduced in 1966, was EMD’s standard engine through the 1980s.

Original owners 
 
The six largest buyers, Milwaukee (64), Southern Pacific (58), Seaboard Coast Line Railroad (45), Nacionales de México (25), Long Island (23), and Louisville & Nashville (10), were all buying road locomotives with AR10 alternators throughout the 1970s, so the similarly-equipped MP15AC was easily kept in good repair. 36 more units were sold to 8 other customers.

See also 
List of GM-EMD locomotives
List of GMD Locomotives
 EMD MP15AC photos at rrpicturearchives.net

References

External links
 Sarberenyi, Robert. EMD MP15DC, MP15AC, and MP15T Original Owners

B-B locomotives
MP15AC
MP15AC
Diesel-electric locomotives of the United States
Railway locomotives introduced in 1975
Standard gauge locomotives of the United States
Standard gauge locomotives of Canada
Standard gauge locomotives of Mexico
Diesel-electric locomotives of Canada
Diesel-electric locomotives of Mexico
Shunting locomotives